Erik Swane Lund (4 April 1923 – 31 October 2012) was a Danish fencer and lieutenant colonel of the Army Reserve. He competed in the team épée events at the 1952 Summer Olympics.

References

1923 births
2012 deaths
Danish male fencers
Olympic fencers of Denmark
Fencers at the 1952 Summer Olympics
Sportspeople from Copenhagen